Geography Now (also stylized as Geography Now!) is an American educational YouTube channel and web series created and hosted by Paul Barbato, profiling countries in the world in alphabetical order as well as covering other topics regarding physical or political geography. The channel was started in 2014 and has since gained over 3.18 million subscribers.

Team
 Paul Barbato (born on 7 June 1987 in Minnesota) also known as Barby or Barbs – creator and host. He started Geography Now! because he felt there were no channels with the specific goal of profiling every country, thus decided to start one himself. He has stressed the importance of geography education and criticized the lack of it in American curriculums.
 Keith Everett – music segment
 Hannah Bamberg, also known as "Random Hannah" – culture segment.
 Noah Gildermaster – food segment
 Kaleb Seaton, also known as "Gary Harlow" (a “knockoff Steve Irwin”) – wildlife segment 
 Arthur "Art" Napiontek – sports segment 
 Bill Rahko – theme music composer
 Vincent Kierkels - graphics designer/ animator
 Peadar Donnelly – graphics designer/animator
 Jared Stevenson – graphics designer/ animator
 Jason King – graphics designer (formerly)
 Ken O’Donnell – animator (formerly)

Channel

Geography Now!
The channel series started on October 15, 2014 with Afghanistan. The member states of the United Nations are covered in alphabetical order with few exceptions, such as when Swaziland changed its name to Eswatini after E had already been passed. However, the Republic of Macedonia, like in the UN, was titled "Macedonia (FYROM)" for "Former Yugoslav Republic of Macedonia" in order to prevent controversy from Greek viewers who identify the name "Macedonia" as purely Greek. As such, the Macedonia episode is on the "F" category. However, it was changed as the country changed its name to the Republic of North Macedonia. English names are also used, so an episode is "Ivory Coast" and not "Cote d'Ivoire." Barbato has said he ensures his videos keep a fairly fast pace while including visual graphics for accessibility.

 Flag Dissection, about the meaning and symbolism behind the country's flag. After signing with Studio 71, this segment was moved to Flag/Fan Days.
 Political Geography, giving a closer look at the country's borders, enclave and exclaves, territorial disputes and anomalies, administrative divisions, over seas territories, notable places and more.
 Physical Geography, about the country's land makeup, demarcations, landscape, arable land, climate, biodiversity, and food.
 Demographics, about the country's population, people, diversity, traditions, culture, government, notable people, and history.
 Friend Zone, an analysis on the country's relationship with other countries.

Flag/Fan Days
Flag/Fan Days are companion videos to the main episodes. A country's flag and coat of arms are explained in these videos. Barbato also sometimes uses this as an opportunity to discuss topics he did not get to in the original video, or correct and clarify details. After that he calls crew members and opens fan mail. There is a recurring animation for most episodes of Flag/Fan Days where the red stands for the "blood of those who fight for their freedom", which has since became a running gag if the red on the countries flag represents the blood of those who fought for the country.

Geography Now! episodes
The countries discussed in each episode follow the United Nations alphabetical list of members and go through them in the respective order.

Episodes

Other content
Filler week videos happen when the team is in the process of researching and creating scripts for the next few videos. Topics discussed include states or sub regions of countries, current or cultural events, physical geography, and infrastructure innovations.

Geography Go is the channel's travel vlog series. Countries visited include Qatar, Finland, Estonia, Greenland, Iceland, Bahrain, Saudi Arabia, United Arab Emirates, Malaysia, Ukraine,
Indonesia and Singapore. Geography Come is a series in which international team members visit. Paul also later started posting YouTube Shorts on his channel about his travels to other countries like Slovakia, Slovenia, Poland, Croatia, the Central African Republic and Togo.

A Geograbee is the geography equivalent of a spelling bee in which people are tested on geography. He has so far hosted them in Hargeisa in Somaliland, Somalia, and Alaska.

For April Fools' Day, Geography Now! uploads videos profiling fictional countries made up by Barbato. These include:
 Bandiaterra (2015), a Danish-speaking island nation in the Indian Ocean
 Limberwisk (2018), a Nordic country whose language consists entirely of whispers
 Patch Amberdash / Datcsh (2019), a confederation of islands spread across three continents
 Qitzikwaka (2020), a former Russian colony situated mostly underground in the Sahara
 Sovonthak (2021), a country situated on eight shallow reefs with a legally-recognized and taxed bartering system
 Volanca (2022), a country with no territory founded by UN interpreters with citizens' residences serving as legal lodging

Reception
Geography Now! generally receives positive feedback from newspapers and magazines in the countries covered, such as Japan Today, Télérama, Dutch Metro, RTL, Nezavisne Novine, Life in Norway, Lovin Malta, and Zoznam. It also receives endorsements from educators and travel writers. The channel has appeared on several lists of recommended educational YouTube channels, including one by the Van Andel Institute. The few criticisms are usually to do with tone and pronunciation, particularly in earlier episodes. The top 10 country episodes with the most views as of March 2023 are Germany at 8.023 million views, followed by Indonesia (6.891 million), Japan (6.471 million), China (PRC) (5.806 million), North Korea (5.689 million), Israel (5.639 million), India (5.168 million), Denmark (4.684 million), Russia (4.564 million), and Philippines (4.139 million).

References

External links
 
 Official website

2014 web series debuts
2010s YouTube series
2020s YouTube series
Documentary web series
Education-related YouTube channels
American non-fiction web series
Works about geography
YouTube channels launched in 2014
YouTube original programming